The 1970 United States Senate election in Delaware took place on November 2, 1970. Incumbent Republican U.S. Senator John J. Williams retired. Republican Party U.S. Representative Bill Roth was elected to succeed him.

General election

Candidates
Donald G. Gies, Air Force veteran (American)
William Roth, U.S. Representative from Wilmington (Republican)
Jacob W. Zimmerman, potato farmer (Democratic)

Results

See also 
 1970 United States Senate elections

References

Delaware
1970
1970 Delaware elections